The men's 100 metre freestyle event at the 1952 Summer Olympics took place between 26 and 27 July at the Helsinki Swimming Stadium. There were 61 competitors from 33 nations. Nations had been limited to three swimmers each since the 1924 Games. The event was won by Clarke Scholes of the United States, the nation's second consecutive and seventh overall victory in the men's 100 metre freestyle (most of any nation). Japan, absent from the 1948 Games after World War II, returned to the podium in the event with Hiroshi Suzuki's silver. Göran Larsson earned Sweden's first medal in the event since 1908 with his bronze.

Background

This was the 11th appearance of the men's 100 metre freestyle. The event has been held at every Summer Olympics except 1900 (when the shortest freestyle was the 200 metres), though the 1904 version was measured in yards rather than metres.

Two of the eight finalists from the 1948 Games returned: bronze medalist Géza Kádas of Hungary and fifth-place finisher (and European champion) Alex Jany of France. There was no clear front-runner this year; Dick Cleveland was the closest to a favorite.

Ceylon, Guatemala, Hong Kong, Israel, Portugal, Romania, Singapore, South Africa, the Soviet Union, venezuela, and Vietnam each made their debut in the event. The United States made its 11th appearance, having competed at each edition of the event to date.

Competition format

The competition used a three-round (heats, semifinals, final) format. The advancement rule was new, introducing a major change from the format used from 1912 to 1948. A swimmer's place in the heat was no longer used to determine advancement; instead, the fastest times from across all heats in a round were used. There were 9 heats of 6 or 7 swimmers each. The top 24 swimmers advanced to the semifinals. There were 3 semifinals of 8 swimmers each. The top 8 swimmers advanced to the final. Swim-offs were used as necessary to break ties.

This swimming event used freestyle swimming, which means that the method of the stroke is not regulated (unlike backstroke, breaststroke, and butterfly events). Nearly all swimmers use the front crawl or a variant of that stroke. Because an Olympic size swimming pool is 50 metres long, this race consisted of two lengths of the pool.

Records

These were the standing world and Olympic records (in seconds) prior to the 1952 Summer Olympics.

Clarke Scholes broke the Olympic record in the first semifinal with 57.1 seconds.

Schedule

Results

Heats

The 24 fastest swimmers from nine heats advanced to the semifinals.

Semifinals

The 8 fastest swimmers advanced to the final.

 Swim-off

Because there were 3 swimmers with the same swim time, a tie-breaking heat was held. The two fastest swimmers advanced to the final.

Final

References

External links
Men 100m Freestyle Swimming Olympic Games 1952 Helsinki

Men's freestyle 100 metre
Men's events at the 1952 Summer Olympics